Bernhard Dahl (23 November 1898 – 14 February 1963) was a Norwegian diver. He competed in the men's plain high diving event at the 1920 Summer Olympics.

References

1898 births
1963 deaths
Norwegian male divers
Olympic divers of Norway
Divers at the 1920 Summer Olympics
Sportspeople from Bergen
20th-century Norwegian people